Nautonia is a group of plants in the family Apocynaceae first described as a genus in 1844. It contains only one known species, Nautonia nummularia, native to Brazil.

References

Monotypic Apocynaceae genera
Asclepiadoideae
Taxa named by Joseph Decaisne